The Wugu–Taishan light rail is a planned light rail transit (LRT) system in the Sanchong, Luzhou, Wugu and Taishan Districts, New Taipei City, Taiwan. The route begins from Jixian Environmental Park, passing through Luzhou, Wugu, and Taishan, terminating at the location between Taishan metro station (A5) and Taishan Guihe metro station (A6) on the Taoyuan Airport MRT. A new station (tentative name: Wenzizun, station code: A5a) is also planned to be set up on Taoyuan Airport MRT to allow transfers between the light rail system. Wugu–Taishan light rail is known in the New Taipei Metro system as the Fuchsia line, or line F.

An extension to Banqiao District is also being planned, known as the Taishan–Banqiao light rail.

See also
 Rail transport in Taiwan
 List of railway stations in Taiwan

References

Railway lines in Taiwan